Manila Municipal Airport  is a public-use airport located two nautical miles (4 km) northeast of the central business district of Manila, in Mississippi County, Arkansas, United States. It is owned by the City of Manila.

This airport is included in the FAA's National Plan of Integrated Airport Systems for 2011–2015, which categorized it as a general aviation facility.

Facilities and aircraft 
Manila Municipal Airport covers an area of 630 acres (255 ha) at an elevation of 242 feet (74 m) above mean sea level. It has one runway designated 18/36 with an asphalt surface measuring 4,200 by 60 feet (1,280 x 18 m).

For the 12-month period ending July 31, 2010, the airport had 31,100 aircraft operations, an average of 85 per day: 99.7% general aviation and 0.3% military. At that time there were 13 aircraft based at this airport: 93% single-engine and 0% multi-engine.

References

External links 
 Aerial image as of 21 January 2002 from USGS The National Map
 

Airports in Arkansas
Transportation in Mississippi County, Arkansas